Prem Chand Gupta (born 3 February 1950) is an Indian politician and a former cabinet minister in Ministry of Corporate Affairs of India. He is a member of the Rajya Sabha, the upper house of Indian Parliament from Bihar. Earlier, he was elected from Jharkhand to the Rajya Sabha. He had some involvement in coal scam. He was previously an NRI based in Hong Kong who promoted a factory manufacturing watches in India (Indo Swiss Time) and entered politics later. He currently lives in South Extension, New Delhi.

References 

Living people
1950 births
Members of the Cabinet of India
Rashtriya Janata Dal politicians
Rajya Sabha members from Bihar
Rajya Sabha members from Jharkhand
Coal block allocation scam
Ministers for Corporate Affairs
People charged with corruption